The Thornton Peak calyptotis or Thornton Peak skink (Calorodius thorntonensis)  is a species of skink found in Queensland in Australia.

References

Skinks